Cattaraugus Village Commercial Historic District is a national historic district located at Cattaraugus in Cattaraugus County, New York. The district encompasses 19 contributing buildings in the central business district of Cattaraugus.   The district developed between about 1880 and 1920, and includes buildings in a variety of architectural styles including Italianate, Queen Anne, Romanesque Revival, Classical Revival, and Second Empire.  Notable buildings include the American Cutlery Museum building (1888), Clayton Rich Building (1890), former Bank of Cattaraugus (1882), Crawford House (c. 1891), and Hook and Ladder Building (1892).

It was listed on the National Register of Historic Places in 2014.

References

Historic districts on the National Register of Historic Places in New York (state)
Second Empire architecture in New York (state)
Italianate architecture in New York (state)
Queen Anne architecture in New York (state)
Neoclassical architecture in New York (state)
Romanesque Revival architecture in New York (state)
Historic districts in Cattaraugus County, New York
National Register of Historic Places in Cattaraugus County, New York